The Divine Lady of Song is a jazz album by the vocalist Sarah Vaughan. It was released on July 1, 2004.

Track listing 
 "Just One of Those Things" – 1:47
 "Corner To Corner" – 3:09
 "I Cried For You" – 2:16
 "Tenderly" – 2:28
 "Perdido" – 2:39
 "Misty" – 3:34
 "Lover Come Back To Me" – 2:50
 "You're Mine, You" – 3:10
 "But Not for Me" – 2:01
 "On Green Dolphin Street" – 3:03
 "Careless" – 2:20
 "What Is This Thing Called Love" – 2:10
 "Gone With The Wind" – 3:30
 "All Of Me" – 2:30
 "Don't Blame Me" – 3:05
 "Just One of Those Things" – 2:10
 "While You Are Gone" (Lucky Thompson) – 2:49
 "Mean to Me" – 2:01
 "The More I See You" – 3:17
 "Sometimes I'm Happy" – 6:52

Personnel

Artists 
Sarah Vaughan — vocalist 
Dizzy Gillespie — guest artist, trumpet
Ray Bloch — guest artist

References 

2004 albums
Sarah Vaughan albums